Sethubavachatram is a village located in Thanjavur district, Tamil Nadu, India. It is largely a fishing and farming community. It has the harbor enough to place only 50 boats but nearly 100 boats are there. Every boat has Indian Nation Flag on the (Paai Maram) and the paintings on the boat will have the name of the Owner or their son and will have the unique no to identify its Starts like(TNJ 001...). The village is home to a government school.

Villages in Thanjavur district